Moseyevo is a rural locality (a village) in Andreyevskoye Rural Settlement, Vashkinsky District, Vologda Oblast, Russia. The population was 23 as of 2002.

Geography 
Moseyevo is located 46 km northwest of Lipin Bor (the district's administrative centre) by road. Antropovo is the nearest rural locality.

References 

Rural localities in Vashkinsky District